The Borletti-Buitoni Trust (BBT) was established as a charitable trust in 2002 to help young musicians throughout the world. The Trust assists classical instrumentalists, ensembles and singers in their early 20s and 30s to further develop their international careers with awards that fund tailor-made projects. The first awards were made in 2003.

The Trust confidentially invites respected figures in the classical music profession to nominate young artists for consideration. Awards are announced in February every other year according to the judgement of the Artistic Committee which comprises Adam Gatehouse, Martijn Sanders, and Mitsuko Uchida, a founding trustee.

In addition to the financial budgets, which range from £20,000 to £30,000, the Trust offers support in matters such as public relations and media communications. Periodically, the Trust also organizes residencies, showcase concerts and concert tours for selected award winners.

, BBT's trustees are Ilaria Borletti-Buitoni, Paul Cutts, and David Landau. The Honorary Committee comprises Leif Ove Andsnes, Richard Goode, Clemens Hagen, and Christian Tetzlaff.

Founding trustee and artistic committee member Franco Buitoni died on 16 August 2016. His wife  created the biennial Franco Buitoni Award as a tribute to his lifelong love and promotion of chamber music.

BBT Communities was set up as another branch of the Trust in 2019 with the aim of giving financial support to charities and organisations that help underprivileged communities through music. The first grants are announced in June 2019.

References

External link

Music charities based in the United Kingdom
Music organisations based in the United Kingdom
Non-profit organisations based in the United Kingdom
2002 establishments in the United Kingdom